The Freedom Spark is the sole album by Larrikin Love.  It was released on 25 September 2006.

Track listing
 "The Spark"
 "Six Queens"
 "Edwould"
 "Downing Street Kindling"
 "Happy as Annie"
 "Meet Me by the Getaway Car"
 "At the Feet of Ré"
 "Well, Love Does Furnish a Life"
 "On Sussex Downs"
 "Forever Untitled"
 "A Burning Coast"
The track "It Explodes" is hidden in the pregap before the first listed track.
Some releases omit the song "Forever Untitled".

iTunes bonus tracks
 "Is It December?"
 "A Little Peace in My Heart"
 "Six Queens (Live from London Calling, Amsterdam)"

Personnel

Larrikin Love
Edward Larrikin
Micko Larkin
Alfie Ambrose
Cathal Kerrigan

Guest musicians
Rob Skipper – tracks 2, 3, 5, 7 & 10
Patrick Wolf – tracks 7 & 9
Jamie T – track 8
Lauren Doss – co-lead vocals on track 8
Airhammer – track 1
Mark Rudland – tracks 6 & 11
Henry Clark – tracks 6 & 11
Tom Gorbutt – tracks 6 & 11
Ollie Cox – track 11
Alex Cox – track 11
Anna "Ma" Larkin – track 10
Jonny Epstein – tracks 10 & 11
Dan Parry – the Knife
Jonnie Fielding – track 7
Iain Gore – glass smashing
Gavin Scrubby – track 11

Additional personnel
Iain Gore – producer (all tracks), mixer (tracks 3 & 7)
Daniel Parry – Assistant Engineer (all tracks)
Tom Joyce – Assistant Engineer (tracks 8 & 11)
Cenzo Townsend – mixer (tracks 2, 4, 5, 6, 8, 9, 10 & 11)
Deidre O'Callaghan – back/front cover photography
Tom Beard – inlay photography

References

2006 debut albums
Larrikin Love albums
Infectious Music albums